Coin Locker Girl (lit. "Chinatown") is a 2015 South Korean film written and directed by Han Jun-hee, starring Kim Hye-soo and Kim Go-eun. It was selected to screen in the International Critics' Week section of the 2015 Cannes Film Festival.

Plot
A baby is found abandoned inside a coin locker at Western Seoul train station in 1996. A beggar takes her and names her Il-young (Kim Go-eun), then when she turns 10, she is taken by the corrupt detective who sells her off to a woman referred to simply as Mother (Kim Hye-soo) as part of his loan payment. Mother is the boss of a loan shark and organ trafficking crime ring in Chinatown, Incheon; she has held on to her position of power by being dispassionate and calculating, and by keeping by her side only those of use to her. Mother decides to raise the young child after she shows toughness and smarts, eventually grooming her for a position in her organization as her personal debt collector. One day, Il-young is given a task to collect debt from Suk-hyun (Park Bo-gum), the son of a debtor. Over the course of a few days, she is initially taken aback by the boy who is not afraid of her and shows her kindness and openness from his own struggles from the past and current with unyielding spirit that she starts to develop special feelings for him. But when his father flees from the debt, Mother orders her to kill Suk-hyun. Il-young cannot go through with it. However, mother's other goons kills and harvests Suk-hyun. Il-young is beaten down and readied to be shipped for Japanese flesh trade. The only family she has ever known falls through the cracks of grief. Il-young escapes and makes her way back to mother, and kills her. Il-young pays respect to her adopted and murdered mother, and runs the business.

Cast

Main
 Kim Hye-soo as Ma Woo-hee / Mother
 Kim Go-eun as Ma Il-young
 Kim Su-an as young Il-young

Supporting

 Uhm Tae-goo as Woo Gon
 Wi Ha-joon as young Woo-gon
 Park Bo-gum as Park Seok-hyun
 Go Kyung-pyo as Chi-do
 Lee Soo-kyung as Ssong
 Park Ji-bo as young Ssong
 Cho Hyun-chul as Hong-joo
 So Sang-seop as young Hong-joo
 Lee Dae-yeon as Dr. Ahn
 Cho Soo-hyang as Leukemia child's mother
 Jo Bok-rae as Detective Tak
 Jung Suk-yong as Mr. Woo
 Baek Soo-jang as Number 2
 Lee Jang-won as Chubby
 Oh Dae-hwan as Bruiser
 Lee Sang-hee as Bruiser's wife
 Ki Guk-seo as Man in uniform
 Gi Ju-bong as Man in suit
 Ahn Jae-hong as Police officer 2

Awards and nominations

References

External links 
  
 
 
 

2015 films
2015 crime action films
2010s Korean-language films
Films based on Japanese novels
South Korean crime action films
2010s South Korean films